"Terrorform" is the third episode of science fiction sit-com Red Dwarf Series V and the twenty seventh in the series run. It was first broadcast on the British television channel BBC2 on 5 March 1992. It was written by Rob Grant and Doug Naylor, and was directed by Juliet May. The episode's plot has the Red Dwarf crew rescuing Rimmer from a terraformed moon based on his own psyche.

Plot
While moon-hopping in the Starbug, Arnold Rimmer and Kryten become separated in a planet-quake while claiming a planetoid for the Space Corp. Badly damaged, Kryten detaches his arm, and sends it back to Red Dwarf for help. The arm scares Dave Lister and Cat at first, since Holly described it as a tarantula-like creature when it arrived. Taking another Starbug, the pair track down Kryten near the wreckage and repair him. On the search for Rimmer, the surroundings lead Kryten, Lister and the Cat to conclude that they've landed on a psi-moon: an artificial planetoid that can tune into an individual's (in this case, Rimmer's) psyche and adapt its terrain to mimic his mental state. This psi-moon has appeared to emphasize his mostly dominant negative qualities, with his positive ones being weak and represented by a graveyard.

When the group find Rimmer, they discover him imprisoned by hooded legions of his negative emotions and a creature made of his self-loathing, with the hologram having been given a physical presence as a side-effect of the moon's transformative abilities. Attempting to rescue him, they find themselves struggling against the creature, until it retreats when Kryten reassures Rimmer they won't leave him behind. When they find their Starbug sinking into a swamp made of Rimmer's despair, Lister and Kryten realise they must boost Rimmer's self-confidence with Cat's help, and persuade Rimmer they like him greatly. In response, Rimmer's self-respect and confidence emerge from the graveyard as musketeers and slay Rimmer's personal demons, allowing the group to escape. After leaving the psi-moon, Rimmer suspects the others only pretended to like him just to escape, to which the other three blatantly agree.

Production
Another episode that was cut in the edit room although this time it was felt that some of the dialogue didn't work. The final scenes with the crew gathering around Rimmer to make him feel wanted was trimmed down.

Other small cuts included the Master, who was fully built, but cut down to show only a hand, foot or shadow. This was considered more effective than seeing the character full on.

Some scenes from this episode were incorporated into the second pilot (actually, a promo reel) for the prospective American Red Dwarf series.

Sara Stockbridge and Francine Walker-Lee both appeared as Handmaidens.

Cultural references
 We see Rimmer's 'self respect' and 'self confidence' rise from the dead, looking like two members of The Three Musketeers.
 The word 'Terrorform' is a play on the term terraforming.
 At the start of the episode when Kryten is knocked offline, his CPU plays him a musak version of Copacabana. On the first transmission of this episode the recording used was that by James Last and his orchestra, but subsequent showings used that by Victor Silvester Junior.

Kryten's Colours
During the episode, the viewer can see Kryten's internal display, which among other things shows his system status as various shades of red: Mauve, magenta, taupe, marigold, heliotrope and tangerine.

Reception
The episode was originally broadcast on the British television channel BBC2 on 5 March 1992 in the 9:00pm evening time slot. One review said that the episode "provides an excellent example of how writers Grant and Naylor combine sci-fi premise with a closer look inside one their regular characters." However, among fans it was considered one of the weakest episodes from the series.

References

External links

Series V episode guide at www.reddwarf.co.uk

Red Dwarf V episodes
1992 British television episodes